Webberville may refer to a location in the United States:

Webberville, Michigan
Webberville, Texas